Bartonella coopersplainsensis is a Gram-negative, non-motile bacteria from the genus Bartonella which was isolated from the blood of a wild rat (Rattus leucopus).

References

External links
Type strain of Bartonella coopersplainsensis at BacDive -  the Bacterial Diversity Metadatabase

Bartonellaceae
Bacteria described in 2009